is a Japanese manga author and illustrator. He is the creator of the manga series Psyren and Mieru Hito, both serialized in Weekly Shōnen Jump. His students are  Ryūhei Tamura, the author of Beelzebub, Yūki Tabata, the author of Black Clover and Naoya Matsumoto, the author of Kaiju No. 8. After creating the one-shot manga Godland Company and Sakuran (Tentative), Iwashiro's newest series Kagamigami, was also serialized in Weekly Shōnen Jump before its cancellation. He is native to Kanagawa Prefecture.

Works 
 The 10th Division - Version 1 (2003, Weekly Shonen Jump)
 The 10th Division - Version 2 (2004, Weekly Shonen Jump)
 Dog Child-Kudoh (2004, Weekly Shonen Jump)
 Mieru Hito (2005-2006, Weekly Shonen Jump)
 Psyren (2007-2010, Weekly Shonen Jump)
 Godland Company (2011, Jump NEXT!)
 Sakuran (Tentative) (2013, Weekly Shonen Jump)
 Kagamigami'' (2015, Weekly Shonen Jump)

References

External links 
 
 Toshiaki Iwashiro at Media Arts Database 

1977 births
Manga artists from Kanagawa Prefecture
Living people